Aharon Amram (born 1939) is an Israeli singer, composer, poet and researcher of Yemenite Jewish origin.

Life and career
Amram was born in  Sana'a, Yemen in 1939 to Romia and Shlomo Amram, a rabbi. In 1950 he immigrated to Israel as part of Operation Magic Carpet which was designed to bring Yemenite Jews to Israel, where he landed in the transition camp of Rosh HaAyin. He was quickly singled out for his beautiful voice and started singing at weddings and events. With the encouragement of the Speaker of the Knesset Yisrael Yeshayahu he studied at the conservatory in Tel-Aviv where he was faced with the choice of focusing on either classical music or Yemenite music due to the difference in singing styles.

Having chosen the latter, Amram began to record dozens of short recordings while continuing to perform. As he started getting recognition for his work, he toured in Europe in the early 1960s including a show at the Olympia in Paris and a filmed performance for the BBC in London. He was married in 1968 and had six children.  Amram released many records through the 1960s and 1970s which cemented his status as a singer in Israel and within the Yemenite community and inspired many Israeli Yemenite singers such as Achinoam Nini, Ofra Haza or Zohar Argov. At this time he also wrote the song "Galbi" which was to become a worldwide hit after being sung by Ofra Haza.

Preservation of Jewish Yemenite heritage
Amram considered Jewish Yemenite music his calling and dedicated his later years to preserving it, as well as the community's traditional religious chants and customs. He recorded all five books of the Torah along with prayers, psalms, Shabbat songs and other liturgical traditions on over 120 CDs.

References

External links 
Tunes of Yemen - Aharon Amram for Android. (For discography see http://www.aharonamram.com/ .)
Piyyutim for Simchat Torah disc 1.
Megillat Eichah (portions thereof published by Nosach Teiman):
Chapter 2
Chapter 4
Chapter 5
Purim song: שמח דודי ביום פורים (published by Nosach Teiman).
Aharon Amram: 1988 Selichot in a Rosh HaAyin synagogue
Aharon Amram: שבח אשיר

See also 
 Yemenite Hebrew
 Yemenite Jewish poetry

20th-century Israeli male musicians
21st-century Israeli male musicians
1939 births
Living people
Yemeni emigrants to Israel
Israeli people of Yemeni-Jewish descent
Yemenite Jews in Israel